E. Mark Gold (often written "E Mark Gold" without a dot, born January 25, 1936, in Los Angeles) is an American physicist, mathematician, and computer scientist. 
He became well known for his article Language identification in the limit which pioneered a formal model for inductive inference of formal languages, mainly by computers.
Since 1999, an award of the conference on Algorithmic learning theory is named after him.

Academic education
In 1956, he got a B.S. in mathematics from the California Institute of Technology,
in 1958, he got a M.S. in physics from Princeton University.
In Jan 1965, got his Ph.D. from UCLA, supervised by Abraham Robinson.

Scientific career

In 1962 and 1963, he worked at Unified Science Associates, Pasadena, on physics problems.
About in 1963, he turned to mathematics, working for 
Lear Siegler,
the RAND Corporation,
Stanford University,
the Institute for Formal Studies, Los Angeles,
and
the Oregon Research Institute.
About in 1973, he moved to 
Montreal University 
and about 1977 to
Rochester University.
In 1991, he published from Oakland.

References

External links
 E. Mark Gold at DBLP

20th-century American mathematicians
20th-century American physicists
American computer scientists
People from Los Angeles
California Institute of Technology alumni
Princeton University alumni
University of California, Los Angeles alumni
Academic staff of the Université de Montréal
University of Rochester faculty
1936 births
Living people